Don Leslie is an American actor, known for voicing General Modula in Sym-Bionic Titan and Ra's al Ghul in the videogame Batman: Dark Tomorrow.

Filmography

Film

Television

Videogames

Books

References

External links

Living people
American male video game actors
American male voice actors
Place of birth missing (living people)
Year of birth missing (living people)